Jacques Viot (1898–1973) was a French novelist and screenwriter.

After service in the artillery during the First World War he became involved with the Surrealist movement. From the mid-1930s he began working on screenplays, collaborating with directors such as Marcel Carne, Jacques Feyder and Marcel Camus.

Selected filmography
 Happy Days (1935)
 Under Western Eyes (1936)
 People Who Travel (1938)
 Daybreak (1939)
 Carmen (1942)
 Marie-Martine (1943)
 Lunegarde (1946)
 Back Streets of Paris (1946)
 The Woman in Red (1947)
 The Long Night (1947)
 Night Express (1948)
 Juliette, or Key of Dreams (1951)
 The Call of Destiny (1953)
 The King's Prisoner (1954)
 The Air of Paris (1954)
 House on the Waterfront (1955)
 Black Orpheus (1959)

References

Bibliography
 Crisp, Colin. French Cinema—A Critical Filmography: Volume 2, 1940–1958. Indiana University Press, 2015.
 Richardson, Michael. Surrealism and Cinema. Berg, 2006.

External links

1898 births
1973 deaths
French male screenwriters
Writers from Nantes
20th-century French screenwriters